Songimvelo Game Reserve is a provincial park managed by the Mpumalanga Parks Board in Mpumalanga, South Africa. Songimvelo is a plural word that means 'we are conserving nature' in the siSwati language.

This park forms part of the Songimvelo-Malolotja Transfrontier Conservation Area, a peace park on the border between South Africa and Eswatini. The park was declared a UNESCO World Heritage Site in 2018 as the landscape represents one of the best-preserved successions of volcanic and sedimentary rock, dating back 3.6 to 3.25 billion years. The park is also home to some of the world's oldest rock art.

See also
 Mpumalanga Parks Board
 Protected areas of South Africa

References

Mpumalanga Provincial Parks